Shrimper may refer to:
A person engaged in the shrimp fishery
Cornish Shrimper 19, a British sailboat design
Shrimper Records, an American record company